Ari Buddhism or the Ari Gaing is the name given to the religious practice common in Burma prior to Anawrahta's rise and the subsequent conversion of Bagan to Theravada Buddhism in the eleventh century. It was introduced in the 7th century, possibly through trade contact from India or Tibet.

History
Ari practices have largely been categorized as a tantric form of Buddhism, combining elements of Buddhism, nat worship, indigenous nāga worship and Hinduism. Some scholars claim that it is related to the Buddhist religious practices of Nanzhao and the subsequent Dali Kingdom in modern-day Yunnan, China. Other historians like Than Tun contend that the Aris were forest-dwelling monks who simply differed in monastic practice from Theravadin bhikkhus, especially with regard to adherence to the Vinaya, as they were much less orthodox, allowed to consume alcohol, engage in sexual relations, and eat after midday. Despite his conversion to Theravada Buddhism due to the efforts of a Mon bhikkhu named Shin Arahan, Anawrahta still supported Mahayana cultic practices and printed coins in Sanskrit rather than Pali.

References

Bibliography
 
Chan, Maung (March 2005) Theravada Buddhism and Shan/Thai/Dai/Laos Regions.

History of Buddhism in Myanmar
Vajrayana Buddhist schools